Rodolfo Stange Oelckers (born September 30, 1925) is a Chilean politician and former Senator. He was a member of the Government Junta that ruled Chile during the dictatorship period from 1973 to 1990, representing the police force (Carabineros de Chile); as of 2021, he is the military junta's last surviving member. He was elected Senator in 1998, finishing his term in 2005.

Biography
Stange was born in Puerto Montt, in southern Chile. He is the son of Osvaldo Stange and Ina Oelckers, of German ancestry, and is a Lutheran. Because of his heritage, he studied at the German Institute of Puerto Montt and later in the Liceo de Hombres. He joined the Military in 1945 and the Carabineros two years later. Thanks to a scholarship, Stange was able to continue his university studies in West Germany and upon his return he became a teacher of Police Sciences and Police Administration.

Stange is married to Liliana Toro Oelckers, with whom he has three children, Sergio, Sonia, and Carolina. According the former Minister of the Interior, Enrique Krauss, Stange is supporter of Colo-Colo.

Career
In 1970, Stange was named Administrative Chief of the School of Carabineros. Later, he was appointed the Coronel Director of the Superior Institute of Carabineros. In 1977, after the Chilean coup d'état, he became President of the Mining Company of Vallenar. During the dictatorship of Augusto Pinochet, Stange rose through the ranks until becoming General Subdirector of the police force in June 1982.

Following the political fallout of the Caso Degollados ("Case of the slit throats"), when it was learned that Carabineros were responsible for beheading three communist political dissidents, General Director of the Police César Mendoza Duran resigned from his post. On August 2, 1985, Stange was appointed to the post, serving ex officio as member of the military junta. Stange continued serving as General Director after Pinochet's dictatorship ended in 1990.

After finishing his term as General Director of Carabineros in 1995, Stange continued in politics. He joined the Independent Democratic Union and in 1997 was elected to the 17th Senatorial Circumscription (South Los Lagos). While in the Senate, from 1998 to 2006, Stange initially participated in the Commission of the Environment and the Commission of Maritime Issues, Fishing, and Aquaculture. He later joined the Commission of Government, Decentralization and Regionalization, the Commission of Public Works, and the Special Commission of Security. Besides his membership in the Senate, Stange is involved in agriculture and has an import/export business.

Dictatorship role and controversies
The general was accused of several human rights abuses, including obstruction of justice charges in the Caso Degollados and the murder of Julio Verne Acosta and Carlos Bezmalinovic, both members of the Revolutionary Left Movement, by high-ranking members of DIPOLCAR (Dirección de Inteligencia de Carabineros de Chile, the police intelligence unit). Nevertheless, his involvement was not proven and he has never been convicted of any crimes.

Stange was noted as a "champion" of Colonia Dignidad, a secretive religious enclave with ties to Nazism. The compound, protected by cameras, barbed wire and walls, served as a site for the torture and execution of political dissidents during the Pinochet regime. Leaders of the sect were also accused of extensive child sexual abuse. Stange was reportedly received warmly as a visitor to the Colonia during the dictatorship.

In 2020, the public learned from a leaked document that the Chilean Police planned to rename the Police Sciences Academy after Stange. After public outcry and political controversy over the decision, due to Stange's role in the dictatorship, the administration withdrew the proposed name change.

References

Sources 
 Profile from the Chilean Library of Congress

1925 births
Living people
Heads of state of Chile
Members of the Senate of Chile
Chilean police officers
Chilean anti-communists
People from Puerto Montt
Chilean people of German descent
Independent Democratic Union politicians
General Directors of Carabineros de Chile